Golden Pouch is a 2016 South Korean television series starring Kim Ji-han and Ryu Hyo-young. The series aired daily on MBC from 20:55 to 21:30 (KST).

Plot
Han Seok-hoon (Kim Ji-han), who was given up for adoption at six, tries to find his birth parents in South Korea. An accident on his wedding day leaves him with amnesia, and he mistakenly believes that the parents of Geum Seol-hwa (Ryu Hyo-young), a young TV producer, are his real parents. He stays with the family while recovering and experiences a feeling of family for the first time.

Cast

Main
 Jin Yi-han as Han Seok-hoon
 Choi Seung-hoon as young Han Seok-hoon
 Ryu Hyo-young as Geum Seol-hwa

Yoon Joon-sang's family
 Lee Seon-ho as Yoon Joon-sang
 Song Joon-hee as young Yoon Joon-sang
 Seo Woo-rim as Eun Kap-ja
 Ji Soo-won as Mo Nan-seol
 Cha Kwang-soo as Yoon Jae-rim
 Na In-woo as Yoon Ji-sang
 Seo Hye-jin as Song Jin-joo

Geum Seol-hwa's family 
 Ahn Nae-sang as Geum Jung-do
 Oh Young-sil as Kim Choo-ja
 Dana as Geum Doo-na
 Baek Seo-yi as Geum Se-na
 – as Hwan Dol-yi

Bae Min-hee's family 
 Yoo Hye-ri as Sa Gwi-jung
 Son Seung-woo as Bae Min-hee
 Lee Yong-joo as Bae Min-kyu

Others 
 Kim Ji-eun as Han Sook-hoon's secretary

Reception
During the Golden Pouch break, from February 6 to 15 due to MBC's "Special Program: Vetting the Presidential Nominees", Ryu Hyo-young scandal broke out, which lead to viewers demanding Ryu to step down from the series. However, MBC stated that there have been no talks about Ryu stepping down from her role in the series.

Ratings 
 In this table,  represent the lowest ratings and  represent the highest ratings.
NR denotes that the drama did not rank in the top 20 daily programs on that date.

Notes

References

External links
  

2016 South Korean television series debuts
2017 South Korean television series endings
Korean-language television shows
MBC TV television dramas